Keahikuni Kekauʻōnohi (c. 1805–1851) was a Hawaiian high chiefess who was a member of the House of Kamehameha. She was granddaughter to King Kamehameha I and one of the wives of Kamehameha II. Her Christian name is disputed; it is given as Mikahela in the 1848 Mahele Book and as Miriam in later sources.

Biography 
She was born circa 1805 at Lahaina, Maui. Her father was Kahōʻanokū Kīnaʻu. Her mother was Kahakuhaʻakoi Wahinepio, sister of Boki and Kalanimoku and granddaughter of Alii Nui, Kekaulike of Maui. Her father was a son of Kamehameha I and his wife Peleuli, daughter of Kamanawa, one of the royal twins.

She married her uncle Kamehameha II. She was one of his five wives. Others were Kamāmalu, Pauahi, Kīnaʻu, and Kekāuluohi. She was the youngest, but Kamāmalu was Liholiho's favorite.
She was at the famous meal when the kapu system was overturned in 1819, known as the ʻAi Noa.  
After Liholiho's death in London, she went to Kauaʻi to live with her half-brother Kahalaiʻa Luanuʻu, who served as governor of Kauaʻi from 1824 to 1825.

Kekauʻōnohi served as a governor of the island of Kauaʻi some time around 1840–1845 and was a stanch Protestant.
Kamehameha III created the House of Nobles in the Hawaiian Constitution of 1840. She was among the first members along with the King, Hoapiliwahine, Pākī, Kōnia, Keohokalole, Kuakini, Kahekili, Leleiohoku I, Kekuanaoa, Kealiʻiahonui, Kanaʻina, Keoni ʻĪʻī, Keoni Ana, and Haʻalilio.

After the death of Kuhina Nui, Kaʻahumanu in 1832, she remarried Kealiʻiahonui, former alii of Kauaʻi and the son of Al'iI Nui, Kaumualiʻi of Kauaʻi. They had no children. After his death in 1849 she remarried Levi Haʻalelea, a relative of Queen Kalama (wife of Kamehameha III) and had a son named William Pitt Kīnaʻu, who died young.
After the Great Mahele in 1848, Kekauʻōnohi was given the second-largest land allotments, seventy-seven ʻāina (land parcels), making her the largest landholder after the King. She inherited most of the land of her uncle William Pitt Kalanimoku along with land given to her by her other relatives: Kamehameha III, Kaukuna Kahekili, Kaiko, Koahou, her aunt Maheha, her mother Kahakuhaʻakoi Wahinepio and Hao.
She died in Honolulu June 2, 1851 age 46. Stephen Reynolds in his Journal noted at her death that she was "the last of the old stock of chiefs – one of the best of them – good-natured, benevolent, liberal and generous."
She left her land to her husband Haʻalelea.
She was foster mother of her nieces Abigail Maheha, Mary Ann Kiliwehi and Anna Kaiʻulani.

When the Admiral Henry Byam Martin, aboard HMS Grampus, visited the islands in 1846, he described the Princess Kikuanoki:
The arrival of Kikuanoki — granddaughter of Kamehameha 1st and 1st cousin of the present King — was a treat. She sailed into the room with all the pomp and majesty of Q. Elizabeth. Her dress — evidently got up for the occasion — was a very transparent muslin shirt — through which those parts of her person which in most countries are covered were very visible. A green crape shawl — and a band of red & yellow (the royal colours) round her head completed her costume.

References

Bibliography

 

 
 
 
 
 
 
 
 
 
 
 

 

|-

1805 births
1851 deaths
Royalty of the Hawaiian Kingdom
Hawaiian princesses
Hawaiian Kingdom politicians
Members of the Hawaiian Kingdom House of Nobles
Members of the Hawaiian Kingdom Privy Council
Governors of Kauai
Hawaiian queens consort
Native Hawaiian women in politics
House of Kamehameha
Hawaiian royal consorts
Burials at Waiola Church
Remarried royal consorts